Gounellea capucina is a species of beetle in the family Cerambycidae. It was described by White in 1846.

References

Anisocerini
Beetles described in 1846